In the NUTS (Nomenclature of Territorial Units for Statistics) codes of Poland (PL), the three levels are:

NUTS codes
The regional coding below was last verified on October 20, 2019. The current coding as well as the history can be found under http://ec.europa.eu/eurostat/web/nuts/history

Current NUTS codes

In the 2018 version, the codes are as follows:

Former coding

2015 NUTS codes
In the 2015 version, the codes were as follows:

2008 NUTS codes
In the 2008 version, the codes were as follows:
PL1	REGION CENTRALNY
PL11	Łódzkie
PL113	Miasto Łódź
PL114	Łódzki
PL115	Piotrkowski
PL116	Sieradzki
PL117	Skierniewicki
PL12	Mazowieckie
PL121	Ciechanowsko-płocki
PL122	Ostrołęcko-siedlecki
PL127	Miasto Warszawa
PL128	Radomski
PL129	Warszawski-wschodni
PL12A	Warszawski-zachodni
PL2	REGION POŁUDNIOWY
PL21	Małopolskie
PL213	Miasto Kraków
PL214	Krakowski
PL215	Nowosądecki
PL216	Oświęcimski
PL217	Tarnowski
PL22	Śląskie
PL224	Częstochowski
PL225	Bielski
PL227	Rybnicki
PL228	Bytomski
PL229	Gliwicki
PL22A	Katowicki
PL22B	Sosnowiecki
PL22C	Tyski
PL3	REGION WSCHODNI
PL31	Lubelskie
PL311	Bialski
PL312	Chełmsko-zamojski
PL314	Lubelski
PL315	Puławski
PL32	Podkarpackie
PL323	Krośnieński
PL324	Przemyski
PL325	Rzeszowski
PL326	Tarnobrzeski
PL33	Świętokrzyskie
PL331	Kielecki
PL332	Sandomiersko-jędrzejowski
PL34	Podlaskie
PL343	Białostocki
PL344	Łomżyński
PL345	Suwalski
PL4	REGION PÓŁNOCNO-ZACHODNI
PL41	Wielkopolskie
PL411	Pilski
PL414	Koniński
PL415	Miasto Poznań
PL416	Kaliski
PL417	Leszczyński
PL418	Poznański
PL42	Zachodniopomorskie
PL422	Koszaliński
PL423	Stargardzki
PL424	Miasto Szczecin
PL425	Szczeciński
PL43	Lubuskie
PL431	Gorzowski
PL432	Zielonogórski
PL5	REGION POŁUDNIOWO-ZACHODNI
PL51	Dolnośląskie
PL514	Miasto Wrocław
PL515	Jeleniogórski
PL516	Legnicko-Głogowski
PL517	Wałbrzyski
PL518	Wrocławski
PL52	Opolskie
PL521	Nyski
PL522	Opolski
PL6	REGION PÓŁNOCNY
PL61	Kujawsko-Pomorskie
PL613	Bydgosko-Toruński
PL614	Grudziądzki
PL615	Włocławski
PL62	Warmińsko-Mazurskie
PL621	Elbląski
PL622	Olsztyński
PL623	Ełcki
PL63	Pomorskie
PL631	Słupski
PL633	Trójmiejski
PL634	Gdański
PL635	Starogardzki

2003 NUTS codes
In the 2003 version, the codes were as follows:
PL1	CENTRALNY
PL11	Lodzkie
PL111	Lodzki
PL112	Piotrkowsko-skierniewicki
PL113	Miasto Lodz
PL12	Mazowieckie
PL121	Ciechanowsko-plocki
PL122	Ostrolecko-siedlecki
PL124	Radomski
PL126	Warszawski
PL127	Miasto Warszawa
PL2	POLUDNIOWY
PL21	Malopolskie
PL211	Krakowsko-tarnowski
PL212	Nowosadecki
PL213	Miasto Krakow
PL22	Slaskie
PL224	Czestochowski
PL225	Bielsko-bialski
PL226	Centralny slaski
PL227	Rybnicko-jastrzebski
PL3	WSCHODNI
PL31	Lubelskie
PL311	Bialskopodlaski
PL312	Chelmsko-zamojski
PL313	Lubelski
PL32	Podkarpackie
PL321	Rzeszowsko-tarnobrzeski
PL322	Krosniensko-przemyski
PL33	Swietokrzyskie
PL330	Swietokrzyski
PL34	Podlaskie
PL341	Bialostocko-suwalski
PL342	Lomzynski
PL4	POLNOCNO-ZACHODNI
PL41	Wielkopolskie
PL411	Pilski
PL412	Poznanski
PL413	Kaliski
PL414	Koninski
PL415	Miasto Poznan
PL42	Zachodniopomorskie
PL421	Szczecinski
PL422	Koszalinski
PL43	Lubuskie
PL431	Gorzowski
PL432	Zielonogorski
PL5	POLUDNIOWO-ZACHODNI
PL51	Dolnoslaskie
PL511	Jeleniogorsko-walbrzyski
PL512	Legnicki
PL513	Wroclawski
PL514	Miasto Wroclaw
PL52	Opolskie
PL520	Opolski
PL6	POLNOCNY
PL61	Kujawsko-Pomorskie
PL611	Bydgoski
PL612	Torunsko-wloclawski
PL62	Warminsko-Mazurskie
PL621	Elblaski
PL622	Olsztynski
PL623	Elcki
PL63	Pomorskie
PL631	Slupski
PL632	Gdanski
PL633	Gdansk-Gdynia-Sopot

Local administrative units

Below the NUTS levels, the two LAU (Local Administrative Units) levels are:

The LAU codes of Poland can be downloaded here: ''

See also
 Subdivisions of Poland
 ISO 3166-2 codes of Poland
 FIPS region codes of Poland

References

Sources
 Hierarchical list of the Nomenclature of territorial units for statistics - NUTS and the Statistical regions of Europe
 Overview map of EU Countries - NUTS level 1
 POLSKA - NUTS level 2
 POLSKA - NUTS level 3
 Correspondence between the NUTS levels and the national administrative units
 List of current NUTS codes
 Download current NUTS codes (ODS format)
 Voivodships of Poland, Statoids.com

Poland
Nuts